Tara Singh may refer to:

People
Tara Singh Hayer (1936–1998), Sikh Canadian newspaper publisher who was murdered in 1998
Tara Singh (activist) (Master Tara Singh, 1885–1967), Sikh political and religious leader
Tara Singh Ramgarhia, Sardar, brother of the famous Jassa Singh Ramgarhia in the late 18th century
Tara Singh Varma (born 1948), former Dutch member of the House of Representatives for the GreenLeft party
Tara Singh (weightlifter) (born 1955), Indian weightlifter
Tara Singh (Mumbai politician), (1938-2020) member of the Maharashtra Legislative Assembly
Tara Singh (author), Indian novelist
Tara Singh (Sikh prince) (1807–1859)
Tara Singh (artist) (1931–2016), sculptor from Punjab, India

Places
Qila Tara Singh, a town and union council of Depalpur Tehsil in the Okara District of Punjab Province, Pakistan

Singh, Tara